Saad Houry (born 1952), Lebanese administrator and Deputy Executive Director of the United Nations Children's Fund (UNICEF). He was appointed to this position by United Nations Secretary-General Ban Ki-moon in December 2007.

Before his appointment to the position of Deputy Executive Director, he served as the Director for the Division of Policy and Planning in UNICEF, where he joined in 1978. He has served on a variety of positions in UNICEF, including as Chief of Staff and Deputy Regional Director in the Regional Office for the Middle East and North Africa. He has also taken assignment in Burkina Faso,  Côte d'Ivoire, Yemen, Syria and Lebanon. In addition to the UNICEF, he has also worked for the World Bank and the Arab Gulf Programme for United Nations Development Organizations.

Houry was working at the American University of Beirut before joining the UNICEF.

Houry obtained his Master of Science in neurobiology from the University of London and his Bachelor of Science in biology from the American University in Beirut. He speaks fluently Arabic, English and French.

External links
Saad Houry, UN Biography

Lebanese officials of the United Nations
Living people
UNICEF people
American University of Beirut alumni
Alumni of the University of London
1952 births